Margaret R. Somers is an American sociologist and Professor of Sociology and History at the University of Michigan She is the recipient of the inaugural Lewis A. Coser Award for Innovation and Theoretical Agenda-Setting in Sociology,  Somers's work specializes in historical, political, economic, and cultural sociology and social theory.

Biography

Somers received a MA from Harvard University in Sociology in 1981, and a Ph.D from the same university in 1986.

Publications
Genealogies of Citizenship: Markets, Statelessness, and the Right to Have Rights (Cambridge 2008) won the 2009 APSA Giovanni Sartori Qualitative Methods Award. According to WorldCat, the book is held in 342 libraries 
Reviewed in : 
 
 
 
 
 
Block, Fred L., and Margaret R. Somers. The Power of Market Fundamentalism: Karl Polanyi's Critique. 2014.  According to WorldCat, the book is held in 264 libraries

References

External links
Official CV at Michigan

Living people
1949 births
Harvard University alumni
University of Michigan faculty
American sociologists
American women sociologists
21st-century American women